Dipentodontaceae is a family of flowering plants containing two genera.

 Dipentodon Dunn - southern China, Assam, Myanmar
 Perrottetia Kunth in F.W.H.von Humboldt - southern China, Southeast Asia, Papuasia, Queensland, Hawaii, Latin America.

References

 
Rosid families